Old Ebenezer Church, also known as Ebenezer Methodist Episcopal Church, South, is a historic church located near Latta, Marion County, South Carolina.  It was built in 1856, and is a  one-story, rectangular meeting house style frame church sheathed in white clapboard. It has two entrances on the main façade, corresponding doors on the rear façade, and a gable roof.

It was added to the National Register of Historic Places in 1973.

References

Methodist churches in South Carolina
Churches on the National Register of Historic Places in South Carolina
Churches completed in 1856
19th-century Episcopal church buildings
Buildings and structures in Marion County, South Carolina
National Register of Historic Places in Marion County, South Carolina
Southern Methodist churches in the United States